The Canon EOS 250D is a 24.1 megapixel digital single-lens reflex camera (DSLR) made by Canon. It was announced on 10 April 2019 with a suggested retail price of €549. It is also known as the EOS Kiss X10 in Japan and the EOS Rebel SL3 in North America and the EOS 200D Mark II in Australia and Asia.

Features

 24.1 effective megapixel APS-C CMOS sensor
EF / EFS Canon Mount
 ISO sensitivity 100–25600 (expandable to H2: 51200)
 95% viewfinder frame coverage with 0.87× magnification
 Videos with 4K (cropped) resolution and 24 fps, 25 fps (NTSC / PAL), but no 30 fps mode.
 1080p Full HD video recording up to 60 fps
 720p HD video recording at up to 60 fps
 5.0 frames per second continuous shooting
Dual Pixel Focus with Face and Eye Detection
Focus Peaking in MF
Battery Life : 1070 shots (CIPA)

See also
Canon EOS 100D
Canon EOS 200D

References

External links

Canon EOS 250D specification

250D
Live-preview digital cameras
Cameras introduced in 2019